A turn is a unit of plane angle measurement equal to  radians, 360 degrees or 400 gradians.
Subdivisions of a turn include half-turns, quarter-turns, centiturns, milliturns, etc.

The closely related terms cycle and revolution are not equivalent to a turn, since these are not units of angle.

Subdivisions 
A turn can be divided in 100 centiturns or  milliturns, with each milliturn corresponding to an angle of 0.36°, which can also be written as 21′ 36″. A protractor divided in centiturns is normally called a "percentage protractor".

Binary fractions of a turn are also used. Sailors have traditionally divided a turn into 32 compass points, which implicitly have an angular separation of 1/32 turn. The binary degree, also known as the binary radian (or brad), is  turn. The binary degree is used in computing so that an angle can be represented to the maximum possible precision in a single byte.

The notion of turn is commonly used for planar rotations.

History 
The word turn originates via Latin and French from the Greek word  ( – a lathe).

In 1697, David Gregory used  (pi over rho) to denote the perimeter of a circle (i.e., the circumference) divided by its radius. However, earlier in 1647, William Oughtred had used  (delta over pi) for the ratio of the diameter to perimeter. The first use of the symbol  on its own with its present meaning (of perimeter divided by diameter) was in 1706 by the Welsh mathematician William Jones. Euler adopted the symbol with that meaning in 1737, leading to its widespread use.

The Latin word for turn is versor, which represents a rotation about an arbitrary axis in three-dimensional space. Versors form points in elliptic space and motivate the study of quaternions, an algebra developed by W. R. Hamilton  in the 1840s.

Percentage protractors have existed since 1922, but the terms centiturns, milliturns and microturns were introduced much later by the British astronomer Fred Hoyle in 1962. Some measurement devices for artillery and satellite watching carry milliturn scales.

Unit symbols 
The German standard DIN 1315 (March 1974) proposed the unit symbol "pla" (from Latin:  'full angle') for turns. However, it is a legal unit of measurement in the EU and Switzerland.

The scientific calculators HP 39gII and HP Prime support the unit symbol "tr" for turns since 2011 and 2013, respectively. Support for "tr" was also added to newRPL for the HP 50g in 2016, and for the hp 39g+, HP 49g+, HP 39gs, and HP 40gs in 2017. An angular mode TURN was suggested for the WP 43S as well, but the calculator instead implements "MUL" (multiples of ) as mode and unit since 2019.

Unit conversion 

Proposals for a single letter to represent 2π 

In 1746, Leonard Euler first used the Greek letter pi to represent the circumference divided by the radius of a circle (i.e.,  = 6.28...).

His proposal used a "π with three legs" symbol to denote the constant.

In 2008, Thomas Colignatus proposed the uppercase Greek letter theta, Θ, to represent 2.

The Greek letter theta derives from the Phoenician and Hebrew letter teth, 𐤈 or ט, and it has been observed that the older version of the symbol, which means wheel, resembles a wheel with four spokes. It has also been proposed to use the wheel symbol, teth, to represent the quantity 2, and more recently a connection has been made among other ancient cultures on the existence of a wheel, sun, circle, or disk symbol—i.e. other variations of teth—as representation for 2.

In 2010, Michael Hartl proposed to use the Greek letter tau to represent the circle constant: . He offered two reasons. First,  is the number of radians in one turn, which allows fractions of a turn to be expressed more directly: for instance, a  turn would be represented as  rad instead of  rad. Second,  visually resembles , whose association with the circle constant is unavoidable.

Initially, neither of these proposals received widespread acceptance by the mathematical and scientific communities. However, the use of  has become more widespread, for example:

 The constant  is made available in the Google calculator and in several programming languages such as Python, Raku, Processing, Nim, Rust, Java, .NET, and Haskell.
 It has also been used in at least one mathematical research article, authored by the -promoter Peter Harremoës.
For a more complete list, see List of formulae involving .

Examples of use 
 As an angular unit, the turn is particularly useful in many applications, such as in connection with electromagnetic coils and rotating objects. See also Winding number.
 Pie charts illustrate proportions of a whole as fractions of a turn. Each one percent is shown as an angle of one centiturn.

See also 
 Ampere-turn
 Hertz (modern) or Cycle per second (older)
 Angle of rotation
 Revolutions per minute
 Repeating circle
 Spat (angular unit) – the solid angle counterpart of the turn, equivalent to  steradians.
 Unit interval
 Divine Proportions: Rational Trigonometry to Universal Geometry
 Modulo operation
 Twist (mathematics)

References

External links 
 Tau manifesto

Units of plane angle
Mathematical concepts
1 (number)